Laem Chabang is a port city municipality (thesaban nakhon) in Si Racha and Bang Lamung districts of Chonburi Province, Thailand. It includes Thung Sukhla subdistrict (tambon) and parts of subdistricts Bueng, Nong Kham and Surasak of Si Racha District and part of Bang Lamung township of Bang Lamung District all of Chonburi province.  As of 2019 it had a population of 88,271. The city has grown up around the port, but also serves as a major stop on the coastal highway linking Pattaya and Bangkok via Sukhumvit Road (Hwy 3). The city is also known for hosting a Japanese retirement community with specialty stores geared towards them.

History
Since 1981 the National Economic and Social Development Board (NESDB) has defined Laem Chabang as a target area for the development into a new urban community by constructing and developing infrastructure and public utilities to support the expansion of the community resulting from the development. Industry by carrying out the construction of an international deep sea port. Industrial estates for export. Construction of the Laem Chabang Port. Railway to connect with the Bangkok-Sattahip Port Railway. Realisation of Laem Chabang Community Housing Building.
According to the Eastern Seaboard Development Project the area consists of the whole Thung Sukhla subdistrict and some areas of Surasak subdistrict, Nong Kham subdistrict, Bueng subdistrict and Bang Lamung subdistrict. Development of the port complex started in 1988. The container port was completed in 1991.By raising the status of some areas of Ao Udom sanitation district (sukhaphiban), Laem Chabang subdistrict municipality (thesaban tambon), Si Racha district and Bang Lamung district, Chonburi province was established, announced in the Government Gazette, book 108, issue 211, dated 4 December 1991, effective from 3 January 1992. To be a local government organization that controls and enforces the urban development plan. As well as being an agency that provides social services to the community. Conduct business of various industries with the people to rule and take care. Upholding their localities according to the municipal system.Subsequently Laem Chabang city municipality (thesaban nakhon) was established on 24 May 2010.

The port is part of the Belt and Road Initiative that runs from the Chinese coast to the south via Singapore through the Strait of Malacca towards the southern tip of India, via Mombasa through the Suez Canal to the Mediterranean, there to the Upper Adriatic region to the northern Italian hub of Trieste with its rail connections to Central Europe and the North Sea.

Geography
It is in the development zone under the Eastern Seaboard Development Project, consists of a commercial port, industrial estate centers, playgrounds, sports fields, etc.
Laem Chabang borders to the north: Surasak subdistrict (tambon), Si Racha district (amphoe), Chonburi province (changwat), east: subdistricts Nong Kham and Bueng, Si Racha district, Chonburi province, south: Bang Lamung subdistrict, Bang Lamung district, Chonburi province, west: Gulf of Thailand.

Climate
Laem Chabang city has a tropical savanna climate (Köppen climate classification category Aw). Winters are dry and warm. Temperatures rise until May. Monsoon season runs from May through October, with heavy rain and somewhat cooler temperatures during the day, although nights remain warm. Annual rainfall is 1,151 millimeter (45.3 inch).

Administration
Consists of five subdistricts, 24 villages, 88,271 people in 79,703 households (following House Registration Office).
The latent population, who came to work in various establishments, without moving house registration is approximately 60,000 people.

Logo
The city logo shows a ship, which symbolizes an international commercial port, the chimney characterizes an industrial city, the mountain points to the location of the municipality, the sun means glory.

Religious places
Laem Chabang city municipality is home to the following active temples, where Theravada Buddhism is practiced by local residents: 

Shrines in the city municipality are:
 Chao Pho Komin Shrine (Thung Sukhla)
 City Pillar Shrine (Bang La

Economy
Economic conditions within Laem Chabang city municipality largely depend on industry. Industrial factories operate more than 200 companies. They employ the largest number of workers in Chonburi province.

Laem Chabang Industrial Estate
It is one of the main development activities in Laem Chabang, located on an area of 569 ha (1,406 acres) between the harbor and Sukhumvit Road, Thung Sukhla subdistrict, divided into:
 General industrial zone, 292 ha (721 acres) with approximately 80 companies, among which Mitsubishi car factory and engine factory, Fujitsu General (Thailand), Michelin Siam Company and Meyer Group Company.
 Free business zone, 157 ha (387 acres) with approximately 26 companies in the first phase and 40 companies in the second phase.
 Government and Public utility zone, 121 ha (298 acres) with branches of TOT Public Company, Eastern Investment Economic Center (BOI) and CAT Telecom Public Company Limited.

Saha Group Industrial Park
A private project established in 1977 located West of Motorway 7 at Nong Kham subdistrict, on an area of approximately 208 ha (514 acres), comprising about 80 industrial factories with at least 20,000 employees.

Laem Chabang Port

Thailand's largest port occupies 10.41 km2 (4 sq.mi) and is capable of handling the largest (Post-Panamax) vessels.
Development of the port complex started in 1988 to encourage development outside Bangkok and take advantage of proximity to the Gulf of Thailand. The container port was completed in 1991. In 2014 it handled 6.58 million TEUs, making it the 20th busiest container port in the world. In FY2017 (1 October 2016 – 30 September 2017) it handled 7.7 million TEUs. Much of the international shipping reaching Thailand passes through Laem Chabang. It is a port of call for Princess Cruises and Celebrity Cruises. It accommodated 59 passenger liners in FY2017.

Laem Chabang includes:
 Seven container terminals
 One multipurpose terminal
 One ro-ro terminal
 One passenger ro-ro terminal
 One general cargo terminal
 One shipyard terminal
 Adjacent Harbor Mall

The Port Authority of Thailand is responsible for the port overall. It engages private sector contractors to manage various port operations.

Petroleum Industry
Three oil refineries:
 Thai Oil Refineries Public Company Limited
 Esso (Thailand) Public Company Limited
 Thai Lube Base Oil Refineries Public Company Limited
Three petroleum oil depots:
 Thai Oil Public Company Limited
 Esso (Thailand) Public Company Limited
 PTT Public Company Limited
Three PPG depots:
 Thai Oil Public Company Limited
 Esso (Thailand) Public Company Limited
 PTT Public Company Limited

Transportation
Transportation is a continuous business from all this industry. There is a kaleidoscope of transport companies based in Laem Chabang, of which there are a few:
 CJ Logistics (Thailand) Co. Ltd.
 ESCO - Eastern Sea Laem Chabang Terminal Co. Ltd.
 Freight Links Express (Thailand) Co. Ltd.
 Logem Transport Co. Ltd.
 MON transport Co. Ltd.
 MSC Depot Laem Chabang.
 Shipco Transport (Thailand) Ltd.
 WICE Logistics Public Co. Ltd.

Agriculture
In the past there were a lot of pineapple plantations in the area of present-day Laem Chabang city municipality. Today agriculture has declined dramatically, mainly due to the growing industry.

Water management
 Laem Chabang Industrial Estate uses an average 23,000 m3/day of tap water from Huai Nong Kho water reservoir in Nong Kham subdistrict.
 Waste water of 8,000 m3/day produces
 2,500 m3/day of industrial water by means of reverse osmosis (RO) system.

Education
There is one university: Kasetsart University Sriracha Campus
Three municipality schools:
 Laem Chabang school District 1
 Laem Chabang school District 2
 Laem Chabang school District 3
Twelve primary/secondary schools under the Chonburi Educational Service Area Office 3:
 Ban Bang Lamung school
 Ban Chak Yai Chin school
 Ban Thungkrad school
 Thai Kasikorn Songkhro Company school 
 Thungsukla Phitthaya school 
 Wat Ban Na school 
 Wat Laem Chabang school
 Wat Mai Noen Phayom school
 Wat Manorom school
 Wat Nong Khla school
 Wat Phra Prathapon school
 Wat Sukree Bunyaram school
Four private schools:
 Boon Psychology school
 Laem Chabang Engineering school 
 Laem Chabang Technology school
 Thanapon Wittaya school
There are also eight child development centers in Laem Chabang city municipality

Health
A governmental and a private hospital in Laem Chabang.
 Laem Chabang Hospital (formerly Ao Udom Hospital) is a governmental hospital.
 Vibharam Laem Chabang Hospital (formerly Laem Chabang International Hospital) is a private hospital.
Three Public Health Service Centers:
 Public Health Service Center 1 (Nong Kham)
 Public Health Service Center 2 (Thung Krad)
 Public Health Service Center 3 (Khao Nam Sub)
Further about 24 private clinics.

Sports

Golf
Laem Chabang has a world class golf course, the Laem Chabang International Country Club designed by Jack Nicklaus. This golf course in Bueng subdistrict consists of 27 holes on 283 ha (700 acres). "Mountain 9" is 3,151 m (3,446 yards) in length. "Lake 9" is 3,126 m (3,419 yards) in length.

Football
Laem Chabang municipal Stadium is currently used mostly for football matches and holds 2,000 people. In 2017 it was announced that the track would be surfaced to enable the hosting of major athletics events.
Laem Chabang City FC plays in Thai Lower Division with average of 250 spectators.

Communities
Laem Chabang city municipality has 23 communities (chumchon), although not directly chosen by the local citizens, which provides advice and recommendations to local administrative organisations. They also promote and support community participation and enterprises at the district level and subdistrict villages.

References

External links

 Website of municipality
 Port of Laem Chabang (Thai, English)

 
Populated places in Chonburi province
Gulf of Thailand